Hilda Oates Williams (25 March 1925 – 19 September 2014) was a Cuban stage and television actress. She was awarded with the National Theater Award in 2004.

Filmography

References

External links

1925 births
2014 deaths
Actresses from Havana
Cuban stage actresses
Cuban television actresses
Cuban film actresses
20th-century Cuban actresses